PHNX or phnx may refer to:

Phnx (script), the Phoenician alphabet
ISO 15924:Phnx, the Paleo-Hebrew alphabet and Phoenician script
PHNX, the trading mark of the company Phoenix Group on the London Stock Exchange
PHNX (rapper) aka Féniksi (born 1976), French rapper of Niger origin, also known as Féfé, real name Samuël Adebiyi